Astroburger is a Norwegian rock band founded by Geir Stadheim, Helge Waaler and R. C. Thrap-Meyer in 1987. Stadheim is the main force in the group and the sole remaining member of the original band.

Personnel

Current members
Geir Stadheim (1987 - present) - vocal, guitar
Per Øystein Lund (1997 - present) - bass, guitar
Andreas Mastrup  (2005 - present) - bass
Jan Henning Sørensen (2008 - present) - drums
Mats Asvald Innstø (2013 - present) - organ, synth

Past members
Pio Pethon (1995 - 2012) - drums
David Gurrik (1989 - 2002) - organ
Andreas Grøtterud (1990 - 2004) - guitar, bass
Vebjørn Lien (1987 - 1987) - bass
Tage Bjørklid (1987 - 1987) - drums
Kim Nordhuus (1988 - 1988) - keyboard
R.C. Thrap-Meyer (1987 - 1989) - bass
Vegard Arnesen (1989 - 1989) - bass
Elizabeth Lyseng (1989 - 1989) - guitar
Helge Waaler (1987 - 1992) - guitar, bass
Knut Grønseth (1988 - 1994) - drums, cake
Mikkel Bay Vold (1989 - 1995) - bass
Stein Friling (1994 - 1995) - drums
Rolf Yngve Uggen (1992 - 1997) - guitar
Ola Breidal (1995 - 2001) - bass

Discography

Singles

1988 She's a girl 7´
1990 Finally arrives 7´
1993 Pinboing wizard 7´ (Mongoloid)
1996 Get with it 7´

CDs/LPs

1991 Venus Beach/Lost on Venus Split-LP Astroburger/Monsters Of Doom (The Tables)
1992 I Used to be Mod
1992 Beyond the Valley of Astroburger (The vinyl version of "I Used to be Mod")
1994 In Orbit
1996 Stand on It
1997 Quite Obscure and Practically Marzipan [compilation of oddities]
1999 Inferno in Fano
2002 Equalize It
2006 They Came from the Sun
2013 Lightyears behind

The Year of Singles, 2001

2001 2001 - A Pop Odyssey:
"Golden Falcon"/"A For Astro - B For Burger"
"Norman the Poet's Christmas Carol"/"2001 - A Pop Odyssey Theme"
"Popdown"/"Always a Route Through the Galaxies of My Mind"/"Rescue"
"Low"/"Stars Burning Out"/"The Mess You Left Behind"
"Edwin the Idiot"/"Supernova"
"The Horse"/"The Midget Walk"
"All Night Long"/"Schwarzwald"
"We Came For You"/"Congo"
"As the Fury Turns"/"Urban Guerilla"
"She Wants to Be Someone"/"The Pavilion"
"Southern Sky"/"Yellow"
"This Is Gonna Save You"/"Timothy Modhead"

Compilations

1992 Shit! Too Early: "Lada 1500" and "Dreaming"(Blondie cover)
1992 Penguins and Bondage: "I Want to Be Alone"
199? She Didn't Even Draw a Fish on My Shower Curtain: "You Put the Name of Rock and Roll in Vain"
1994 A Perfect Pop Compilation 1991-1994: "Story of a Girl" and "Feed that Monster"
1996 Ellediller & Krokofanter: "Sov Godt"
2001 Bestrummed! Perfect Pop 1995-2001: "Afford to Lose"
2004 Last Train Oslo Presents: No Music Requests: "Manhole 69", "Live I Normandie"
2006 Mange Motstandere - Ingen Motstand (En hyllest til Vålerenga): "Laget Vårt"

External links
Home Page
 Astroburger at Myspace
 Astroburger at Youtube

Norwegian rock music groups
Musical groups established in 1987
1987 establishments in Norway
Musical groups from Norway with local place of origin missing